Omar Kabbaj is advisor to King Mohammed VI of Morocco since 22 June 2006. He was the chairman of the African Development Bank from 26 August 1995 to 1 September 2005.
Before that, he was a member of the board of the International Monetary Fund (1980–1993) and member of the board of directors of the World Bank (1979–1980) and minister delegate to the prime minister of Morocco, in charge of affairs economic, from 1993 to 1995.
Omar Kabbaj is also a Knight of the Order of the Throne of Morocco. He holds a master's degree in management from Toulouse Business School.

References

External links
Profile @ the World Economic Forum

1942 births
Living people
Moroccan businesspeople
People from Rabat
Advisors of Mohammed VI of Morocco
Moroccan chief executives
Toulouse Business School alumni